Pegella was a town of ancient Lycaonia, inhabited in Byzantine times. 

Its site is located near Azak, Cihanbeyli, Konya Province, Turkey.

References

Populated places in ancient Lycaonia
Former populated places in Turkey
Populated places of the Byzantine Empire
History of Konya Province